Shorea laevis is a species of tree in the family Dipterocarpaceae. It is native to Myanmar,  Thailand, Sumatra, Peninsular Malaysia and Borneo. It is considered Vulnerable due to deforestation for agriculture and being logged for its timber.

References

laevis
Trees of Thailand
Trees of Myanmar
Trees of Sumatra
Trees of Peninsular Malaysia
Trees of Borneo
Plants described in 1922
Taxonomy articles created by Polbot